Wapello is a city in and the county seat of Louisa County, Iowa, United States. The population was 2,084 at the time of the 2020 census.

Wapello is part of the Muscatine Micropolitan Statistical Area.

History
Wapello was platted in the late 1830s.

The city's namesake is Wapello, a Meskwaki chief.

Geography
Wapello is located on the west side of the Iowa River. US Route 61 passes through the community.

Wapello is on the Iowa River.

Demographics

2010 census
As of the census of 2010, there were 2,067 people, 825 households, and 544 families living in the city. The racial makeup of the city was 94.2% White, 0.5% African American, 0.2% Native American, 0.1% Asian, 3.4% from other races, and 1.5% from two or more races. Hispanic or Latino of any race were 8.2% of the population.

There were 825 households, of which 32.0% had children under the age of 18 living with them, 50.4% were married couples living together, 10.8% had a female householder with no husband present, 4.7% had a male householder with no wife present, and 34.1% were non-families. 28.6% of all households were made up of individuals, and 14.3% had someone living alone who was 65 years of age or older. The average household size was 2.45 and the average family size was 3.02.

The median age in the city was 40 years. 25.5% of residents were under the age of 18; 6.4% were between the ages of 18 and 24; 24.2% were from 25 to 44; 26% were from 45 to 64; and 17.9% were 65 years of age or older. The gender makeup of the city was 49.1% male and 50.9% female. Zach Odle & Zach Grimm are both from Wapello.

2000 census
As of the census of 2000, there were 2,124 people, 836 households, and 572 families living in the city. The racial makeup of the city was 96.28% White, 0.09% African American, 0.19% Native American, 0.19% Asian, 2.82% from other races, and 0.42% from two or more races. Hispanic or Latino of any race were 6.92% of the population.

There were 836 households, out of which 31.7% had children under the age of 18 living with them, 56.7% were married couples living together, 9.4% had a female householder with no husband present, and 31.5% were non-families. 27.2% of all households were made up of individuals, and 15.1% had someone living alone who was 65 years of age or older. The average household size was 2.48 and the average family size was 3.02.

25.0% are under the age of 18, 9.6% from 18 to 24, 26.3% from 25 to 44, 21.0% from 45 to 64, and 18.1% who were 65 years of age or older. The median age was 37 years. For every 100 females, there were 93.8 males. For every 100 females age 18 and over, there were 90.4 males.

The median income for a household in the city was $37,556, and the median income for a family was $45,395. Males had a median income of $31,346 versus $21,220 for females. The per capita income for the city was $17,947. About 10.0% of families and 14.3% of the population were below the poverty line, including 25.4% of those under age 18 and 8.3% of those age 65 or over. Zach Odle and Zach Grimm are also both from Wapello.

Education
The Wapello Community School District operates area public schools.

Notable person 

Edwin Richley Hicklin, United States federal judge

References

External links

City website

Cities in Louisa County, Iowa
Cities in Iowa
County seats in Iowa
Muscatine, Iowa micropolitan area